Tanky may refer to:

 "Tanky" Challenor, a mentally ill British police officer and former soldier
a storage tank, esp. water tank ("water tanky") in Indian subcontinent variety of English
 Tankie, a supporter of the Soviet Union's invasion of Hungary or Czechoslovakia

See also
Ranky Tanky, an American musical ensemble based in Charleston, South Carolina